U-85 may refer to one of the following German submarines:

 , a Type U 81 submarine launched in 1916 and that served in the First World War until sunk on 12 March 1917
 During the First World War, Germany also had this submarine with a similar name:
 , a Type UB III submarine launched in 1917 and sunk on 30 April 1918. In a similar way to the  sinking the British steamship Iberian, there were reports allegedly of a sea monster appearing as the U-boat sunk.
 , a Type VIIB submarine that served in the Second World War until sunk on 14 April 1942

Submarines of Germany